Embaúba is a municipality in the state of São Paulo in Brazil. The population is 2,449 (2020 est.) in an area of 83.1 km². The elevation is 570 m.

References

Municipalities in São Paulo (state)